U.S. Newswire was a U.S. national news release wire service established in 1986 which distributed media materials for a variety of customers, particularly the U.S. government and non-profit agencies. U.S. Newswire was based in Washington, D.C. and was acquired from Medialink by PR Newswire on October 1, 2006.

Following its acquisition, U.S. Newswire was renamed PR Newswire Public Interest Services and eventually, in 2014, shut down as a separate division with operations merged into the parent company's general operations.

History
 1986 – U.S. Newswire is founded by William McCarren (president) and Mark Bagley (executive vice president). Company headquarters is established in the National Press Building in Washington, D.C.
 1989 – The Lexis-Nexis database began archiving all U.S. Newswire releases
 1993 – Became the first news release wire service to distribute news for the White House Press Office
 1995 – Launch of website
 1999 – Merged with Medialink
 2000 – AOL began to publish U.S. Newswire feed
 2001 – The White House Press Office under President George W. Bush began publishing on U.S. Newswire
 2001 – Yahoo! News began to publish U.S. Newswire feed
 2002 – Launched full service photography service
 2003 – Google News began to publish U.S. Newswire feed
 2004 – MSNBC.com began to publish U.S. Newswire feed
 2005 – News Unfiltered blog launched
 2006 – U.S. Newswire acquired by PR Newswire for $23 million
 2007 – U.S. Newswire re-branded as PR Newswire Public Interest Services
 2008 – Named "Official Newswire" for 2008 Democratic and Republican National Conventions
 2012 – Named "Official Newswire" for 2012 Democratic and Republican National Conventions.
 2014 – PR Newswire Public Interest Services business is dissolved and folded into general PR Newswire operations
 2015 – PR Newswire was sold to global media company, Cision, for $841 million

References

External links
 U.S. Newswire archived website

Press release agencies
News agencies based in the United States